Kaimla is a village in Karnal district of Haryana, India. It lies in Gharaunda subdivision, about 3 km from Gharaunda. It is about 10 km from Panipat and 20 km from Karnal. The nearest railway stations are at Kohand, 2.5 km from the village, and at Gharaunda. Most of the people are Ror.

References

Villages in Karnal district